Serine/threonine/tyrosine-interacting-like protein 1 is a protein, encoded in humans by the STYXL1 gene.

References

Further reading